

Table
The 1992 National Soccer League First Division was the eighth edition of the NSL First Division in South Africa. It was won by Kaizer Chiefs.

References 

NSL First Division seasons